Fawzi Salloum (born 15 July 1943) is a Syrian wrestler. He competed in the men's Greco-Roman 57 kg at the 1972 Summer Olympics.

References

1943 births
Living people
Syrian male sport wrestlers
Olympic wrestlers of Syria
Wrestlers at the 1972 Summer Olympics
Place of birth missing (living people)